Pityranthe is a genus of flowering plants belonging to the family Malvaceae.

Its native range is China (Guangxi) to Hainan, Sri Lanka.

Species:

Pityranthe trichosperma 
Pityranthe verrucosa

References

Brownlowioideae
Malvaceae genera